The Bumilangit Cinematic Universe (BCU) is a series of Indonesian  media franchise and shared universe centered on a series of superhero films produced by Bumilangit Studios based on characters that appear in comic books published by Bumilangit. Volume 1 of the series began with Gundala in 2019 and will conclude with the release of a team-up film Patriot.

Joko Anwar was announced as the executive producer that will oversee the development of all films in Volume 1 of the series. He wrote and directed Gundala as well as co-wrote Sri Asih.

Development 
The development of the film series came on the heel of the success of Disney's Marvel Cinematic Universe franchise. The production of several films into planned volumes with individual superhero films released before a team-up film resembles the strategy employed by Marvel Studios.

During a Disney+ event in 2020, President of Marvel Studios Kevin Feige spoke with the Bumilangit Cinematic Universe executive producer Joko Anwar and expressed support for the Indonesian superhero franchise while saying that the project is "in the right hands".

Production of several films in the franchise faced delays upon the onset of the COVID-19 pandemic in Indonesia.

Background 
The Bumilangit Universe in the comic book series began in the ancient times and continue well into present day. It is divided into four eras:

 The Legends era, set after the volcanic eruption of Mount Toba which pushed humans to near extinction and revolve around three fictional kingdoms that lead the recovery of human civilizations: the Kingdom of Wiba with its advanced scientific achievements, the Kingdom of Godam with its strong warriors, and the Kingdom of Rawaya with its spiritual devotion.
 The Swordsmen era, set in the 17th century with key characters who are known for their swordsmanship, such as Mandala, Barda Mandrawata, Purnama Wulan Dewi Sartikawati, Selendang Mayang, and Rahayu.
 The Patriot era, with characters such as Mardhanus, Nani Wijaya, Sancaka, and Adam.
 The Revolution era, set in present day.

Films

Volume 1

Gundala (2019) 
Sancaka, an astraphobic son of an Indonesian factory worker who's now a security guard and mechanic in a newspaper printing factory, uses his superpowers to defeat the corrupt crime boss Pengkor. After his allies poison a large shipment of rice, Pengkor uses his undue political influence to force the local legislature's hand in passing a bill to approve the hasty production and distribution of an unproven antidote – unknowingly made by a pharmaceutical company he secretly owns – that will ultimately harm pregnant women.

Bumilangit Studios, as the owner of Gundala's intellectual property, has been developing the idea of making a Gundala movie since 2014. The search for the right director and scriptwriter for Gundala was not easy, and took Bumilangit years to finally find the perfect match. On April 4, 2018, Joko Anwar was announced as the writer and the director for the film. He is one of Indonesia's most prolific and celebrated film directors.

Joko Anwar admitted that the scriptwriting process for Gundala has been the hardest work of his career so far. Usually, he spends one to two months on a typical script, but he eventually ended up spending a total of seven months for this project. Reinterpreting Gundala's origin from the original 1969 comic, he reworked the story in a way that could attract millennials and Gen Z. Hasmi's comics and notes about Gundala helped him write the script.

The film stars Abimana Aryasatya as Sancaka/Gundala, alongside Tara Basro, Bront Palarae, Ario Bayu, Cecep Arif Rahman, Rio Dewanto, and Muzakki Ramdhan. The film received positive reviews from audience and critics with praise for Abimana's performance, Anwar's direction, and the visual effects, costume design, and originality. Throughout its domestic run, the film garnered over 1.6 million admissions, with an estimate gross of $4.7 million.

Sri Asih (2022) 

Alana didn't understand why she was always overcome by anger. But she always tried to fight it. She was born during a volcanic eruption that separated her from her parents. She is then adopted by a rich woman who tries to help her live a normal life. As an adult, Alana discovers the truth about her origins. She's not an ordinary human. She can be good or be evil if she can not control her anger.

On December 7, 2019, Joko Anwar as the creative producer of Bumilangit Cinematic Universe announced that Pevita Pearce would play Sri Asih in Bumilangit Cinematic Universe after her first appearance at the ending of Gundala (2019). The film also stars Christine Hakim as Eyang Mariani, Surya Saputra as Prayogo Adinegara, Jefri Nichol as Tangguh, Reza Rahadian as Jatmiko, Randy Pangalila as Mateo Adinegara, Jenny Zhang as Sarita Hamzah, Dimas Anggara as Kala, Revaldo as Jagau, Faradina Mufti as Renjana, Fadly Faisal as Gilang, Messi Gusti as Young Alana  and a special appearance by Najwa Shihab as Nani Wijaya, the first Sri Asih. The film was directed by Upi, written by Upi and Joko Anwar.

In Indonesian history of fiction literature, Sri Asih is the first hero to appear in Indonesian comics. Sri Asih first appeared about half a century ago, in 1953. Its creator, R.A. Kosasih is recognized as the “Father of Indonesian Comics.”

The shooting process began on November 18, 2020, and finished on April 1st, 2021. On July 6, 2022, Sri Asih released her first teaser trailer. The film was released in cinemas on November 17, 2022 as the second entry of BCU.

Web series

Main cast and characters 
As of November 2022, Gundala and Sri Asih are the first two films to have been released. The following performers have also been confirmed as part of the film series:

 Nicholas Saputra as Mardhanus/Aquanus
 Dian Sastrowardoyo as The Fire Goddess 
 Vanesha Prescilla as Cempaka
 Hannah Al Rashid as Motila/Camar (also appeared as Cantika the Nurse in Gundala)
 Kelly Tandiono as Purnama Wulan Dewi Sartikawati/Eagle-Eyed Angel (also appeared as Mutiara Jenar the Model in Gundala)
Reza Rahadian as Jatmiko
Additionally, action star Iko Uwais has been rumored to star as the titular character in The Blind of the Phantom Cave: Angel's Eyes. However, the rumour is yet to be officially confirmed.

Powers and abilities

Main villains 
The film producers have not confirmed the villain character that will be the main enemy in the film series. However, a scene in Gundala depicting Ghazul (Ario Bayu) summoning the ancient figure Ki Wilawuk (Sujiwo Tejo) led to speculations that the character will serve as the mega-villain for the superhero team-up in later film. But later in the second film of the cinematic universe, Sri Asih, it was revealed that Ki Wilawuk was only one of the five commanders of the suspected ultimate villain namely The Fire Goddess (Dewi Api) who has been sealed for centuries in an unknown volcano by her nemesis, Dewi Asih. These five commanders need to be resurrected in order to free her from the captive and spread terror to the entire world.

See also 

 Superhero film, a film genre

References 

Indonesian superhero films
Films postponed due to the COVID-19 pandemic
Fictional universes
Mass media franchises introduced in 2019
Film series introduced in 2019